The 2020–21 Melbourne Stars season was the tenth in the club's history. The team was coached by David Hussey and under the captaincy of Glenn Maxwell, they competed in the BBL's 2020–21 season.

Season results and standings

Ladder

Regular season

Players

Squad
The following is the Stars men's squad for the 2020–21 Big Bash League season as of 2 January 2020.

 Player ruled out of season due to injury.

Personnel Changes

Incoming Players

Outgoing Players

Statistics

Attendance

Home attendance

Due to the COVID-19 pandemic, all matches were played with a reduced capacity.

Most runs

 Last updated: 30 January 2021
 Source:Cricinfo

Most wickets

 Last updated: 30 January 2021
 Source:Cricinfo

See also
 Melbourne Stars

References

Melbourne Stars seasons